Aglar is a notified area and a town in Zainapora Sub District of Kashmir. It is situated on the left bank of Rambi Ara which demarcates between Pulwama district with Shopian district. Aglar is located  towards east from Pulwama,  from Zainapora and  towards west from Anantnag.
Aglar is 3rd most populous town, located in Zainapora sub district of the state Jammu & Kashmir in India and 3rd biggest town by area in the sub district. The Pin code of Aglar is 192305.

By population, Aglar is one of largest town located in Zainapora Sub District of Shopian district, Jammu and Kashmir with total 522 families residing. The Aglar town has population of 2,864 and the population density of the village is 752 persons per km2 as per 2011 population census. As per constitution of India and Panchyati Raaj Act, Aglar is administrated by Sarpanch who is an elected representative of village.

Well qualified, decent, kind and honest people (mostly youth) are very forward not only in education field but in sports activities as well. In volleyball, football and cricket many people hailing from Aglar represent district and state in different parts of Jammu and Kashmir and outside as well locality. 

The district magistrate of Shopian district has approved the construction of public park, which will be constructed at an estimated cost of 2.5 lakh in Darpeth area of Aglar. The park will be thrown open for public in year 2022.

Transport

Aglar is having well traffic connectivity with Pulwama, Anantnag, Shopian and other towns of South Kashmir. Aglar is having its own sumo stand called Budshah sumo stand aglar, which connects aglar to almost every district and town of South kashmir. The nearest railway stations to Aglar are Bijbehara railway station  from Aglar and Panzgam railway station .

Education

Schools in Aglar
 Jawahar Navodaya Vidyalaya Shopian (JNV Aglar).
 Government Model High School Aglar
 Al-Fallah English Medium School Aglar
 Government  Primary School Nikloora

Healthcare

There is a Sub health centre functioning in the area provides basic health care facilities to the people. Other nearest hospitals to Aglar are:
 Government sub district hospital Zainapora (4 km from Aglar).
 Government Primary health centre Litter (1.5 km from Aglar).
 Government Medical College associated hospital Anantnag (18 km from Aglar)
 Government district hospital Pulwama (13 km from Aglar)

See also
 Darpeth
 Nikloora
 Zainapora
 Litter
 Wachi
 Chitragam
 Pulwama
 Anantnag 
 Bijbehara
 Awantipora

References

Villages in Shopian district
Kashmir